The badminton competition at the 1986 Commonwealth Games took place at the Meadowbank Sports Centre in Edinburgh, Scotland from 24 July until 2 August 1986.

Final Results

Results

Men's singles

Women's singles

Men's doubles

Women's doubles

Mixed doubles

Mixed Team

Semi-finals

Bronze Medal Play off

Final

References

1986
1986 in badminton
Badminton tournaments in Scotland
1986 Commonwealth Games events